The given name Annet is shared by:

In arts and media
 Annet Artani (born 1976), Greek-American singer and songwriter
 Annet Mahendru (born 1985), American actress
 Annet Malherbe (born 1957), Dutch actress
 Annet Nandujja (born 1959), Ugandan musician and composer
 Annet Nieuwenhuyzen (1930–2016), Dutch actress
 Annet Schaap (born 1965), Dutch writer and illustrator
 Annet van Egmond (born 1964), Dutch artist and designer

In politics
 Anita Annet Among (born 1973), Ugandan politician
 Annet Katusiime Mugisha (born 1974), Ugandan politician
 Annet Nyakecho (born 1982), Ugandan politician and businesswoman

In other fields
 Annet de Clermont-Gessant (1587–1660), Maltese prince and military leader
 Annet Morio de L'Isle (1779–1828), French and Dutch brigade commander
 Annet Nakawunde Mulindwa, Ugandan businesswoman
 Annet Olivia Nakimuli (born 1975), Ugandan physician
 Annet Negesa (born 1992), Ugandan runner